George Alexandru Mareș (born 16 May 1996 in Bucharest) is a Romanian footballer who plays as a forward. He started his senior career with Sportul Studențesc.

References

External links

1996 births
Living people
Romanian footballers
FC Sportul Studențesc București players
FC Petrolul Ploiești players
FC Brașov (1936) players
FC Dunărea Călărași players
ASC Daco-Getica București players
Liga I players
Liga II players
Association football forwards